Etch may refer to:

 to carry out an etching process
 Etch (protocol), a network protocol
 Etch (Toy Story), a character from the film Toy Story
 Etch, the codename of version 4.0 of the Debian Linux operating system
 East Tennessee Children's Hospital